Emmanuel Franck Omgba Opono Edoa (born 4 July 1992) is a Cameroonian footballer who most recently played for Spanish club Mérida AD as a midfielder.

Club career
Born in Yaoundé, Omgba joined Torrellano Illice CF's youth setup in 2009 at the age of 16, after representing APEJES Academy, and made his debuts as a senior in the following year, in Tercera División. On 31 August 2011, after making the whole pre-season with Elche CF, he signed a contract with Huracán Valencia CF in Segunda División B.

On 30 December 2011 Omgba was transferred to Segunda División side Girona FC. However, he could not play for the Catalans after having bureaucratic problems, and was released in June of the following year.

On 18 July 2012 Omgba returned to the Franjiverdes, being assigned to the reserves in the fourth level. He was an undisputed starter during his two-year spell at the club, achieving promotion to the third tier in his first campaign.

On 17 July 2014 Omgba signed a one-year deal with Real Oviedo, also in the third division. He scored a career-best seven goals during the season, as his side returned to Segunda División after a 12-year absence; one of his goals, the first in a 3–2 away win against UD Somozas, was the club's 5000th.

Omgba made his professional debut on 13 September 2015, starting in a 2–0 away win against CD Tenerife.

International career
Omgba has represented Cameroon at under-20 level.

Honours
Oviedo
Segunda División B: 2014–15

References

External links

1992 births
Living people
Footballers from Yaoundé
Cameroonian footballers
Association football midfielders
Segunda División players
Segunda División B players
Tercera División players
Huracán Valencia CF players
Girona FC players
Elche CF Ilicitano footballers
Real Oviedo players
Hércules CF players
CD Alcoyano footballers
Mérida AD players
Cameroon youth international footballers
Cameroonian expatriate footballers
Cameroonian expatriate sportspeople in Spain
Expatriate footballers in Spain
APEJES Academy players